San Giorgio in Velabro is a church in Rome, Italy, dedicated to St. George.

The church is located next to the Arch of Janus in the rione of Ripa in the ancient Roman Velabrum. According to the founding legend of Rome, the church was built where Roman history began: it is near  here that the mythical she-wolf found the mythical babies, Romulus and Remus. The façade of the church encroaches upon and incorporates the ancient Arcus Argentariorum.

San Giorgio in Velabro is the station church for the first Thursday in Lent.

History
An inscription, dated in 461 or 482, found in the catacombs of St. Callixtus, probably refers of a church in the same zone, "LOCVS AVGVSTI LECTORIS DE BELABRV", though there is nothing to connect the lector with S. Giorgio.

The first religious building attested in the place of the current church is a diaconia, funded by Pope Gregory I. In September or October 598, Pope Gregory wrote to the abbot Marinianus, that, since his monastery was next door to the church of Saint George «Ad sedem», and since the church had fallen into decay, he granted the church to the monastery provided that they repair and keep up the premises, and solemnly observe the liturgical offices. This has been taken as a reference to S. Giorgio in Velabro, though, as Batiffol points out, nowhere else is the phrase «Ad sedem» connected with the Velabrum or San Giorgio. Additionally, the restoration of the church is to be for the purpose of liturgical celebrations, and is to belong to the monastery in perpetuity, not to a cardinal deacon for diaconal activities.

The current church was built during the 7th century, possibly by Pope Leo II (682–683), who dedicated it to Saint Sebastian. The church's plan is irregular, indeed slightly trapezoidal, as a result of the  frequent additions to the building. As can be seen from the lower photograph, the interior columns are almost randomly arranged having been taken from sundry Roman temples.

The church was inside the Greek quarter of Rome, where Greek-speaking merchants, civil and military officers and monks of the Byzantine Empire lived — the nearby Santa Maria in Cosmedin, for example, was known as in Schola Graeca at the time. Pope Zachary (741-752), who was of Greek origin, moved the relic of St. George to here from Cappadocia, so that this saint had a church dedicated in the West well before the spreading of his worship with the return of the Crusaders from the East.

In 1347, the Roman patriot Cola Di Rienzo posted a manifesto announcing the liberation of Rome on the doors of this church.

Restorations
After a restoration of Pope Gregory IV (9th century), the church received the addition of the portico and of the tower bell in the first half of the 13th century. The apse was decorated with frescoes by Pietro Cavallini in the 13th century.

Between 1923 and 1926, the Superintendent of Monuments of Rome, Antonio Muñoz, completed a more radical restoration programme, with the aim of restoring the building's "medieval character" and freeing it from later additions.  This was done by returning the floor to its original level (and so exposing the column bases) reopening the ancient windows that gave light to the central nave, restoring the apsis, and generally removing numerous accretions from the other most recent restorations. During this process, fragments (now displayed on the internal walls) were found, which indicated that a schola cantorum had existed on the site, which could be attributed to the period of Pope Gregory IV.

Car bomb
The building as we see it today is largely a product of the 1920s restoration.  However, the explosion, at midnight on 27 July 1993, of a car bomb parked close to the facade, required five years' further restoration.  That explosion caused no fatalities but left the 12th century portico almost totally collapsed and blew a large opening into the wall of the main church. Serious damage was also inflicted on the residence next door of the Generalate of the Crosiers (Canons Regular of the Order of the Holy Cross). The Ministry of Cultural Heritage catalogued what was damaged or destroyed, placing the fragments in 1050 crates. Experts researched dates and locational references before restoring the building with them, although some details, particularly in the portico, were deliberately left unrestored as a memorial to the bombing.

Cardinal-Deacons
The church was established as a Deaconry  in the reign of Pope Gregory I (590–604).

Roscemanno, O.S.B.Cas. (c. 1112 – c. 1128))
 Odo (1132–1161)
Gerardus (1162) (a creation of Victor IV)
Manfred (1163–1173)
Rainerius (1175–1182)
Radulfus Nigellus (1185–c. 1190)
Gregorius de Monte Carello (1190–1210)
Bertinus (Bertramus) (1212–1216)
Pietro Capuano iuniore (1219–1236)
Petrus Capoccius (1244–1250)
Gaufridus of Alatri (1261–1287)
Petrus Peregressus (1288–1289)
Giacomo Stefaneschi (1295–1341)
Giovanni de Caramagno (1350–1361)
Guillaume Bragose (1361–1362)
Jacobus Orsini (1371–1379) (Avignon Obedience, in 1378)
Perinus Tomacelli (1381–1385) (Roman Obedience)
 Pierre de Luxembourg (1384–1387) (Avignon Obedience)
Galeozzo Tarlati de Petramala (1388–1400) (Avignon Obedience)
Michael de Salva (1404–1406) (Avignon Obedience)
Carolus de Urries (1408–1420) (Avignon Obedience)
Oddone Colonna (1405–1417), later Pope Martin V.
 Prospero Colonna (1426–1463)
vacant
 Raffaele Riario (1477–1480) 
vacant
 Franciotto Orsini (1517–1519)
 Girolamo Grimaldi (1528–1543)
 Girolamo Recanati de Capodiferro (1545–1559)
 Giovanni Antonio Serbelloni (1560–1565)
 Markus Sitticus von Hohenems Altemps (1565–1577)
 Giovanni Vincenzo Gonzaga (1578–1583)
 Francesco Sforza di Santa Fiora (1584–1585)
 Benedetto Giustiniani (1587, Jan.–Sept.)
 Ottavio Acquaviva d'Aragona (1591–1593)
 Cinzio Aldobrandini (1593–1605)
 Orazio Maffei (1606–1607)
 Giacomo Serra (1611–1615)
 Pietro Maria Borghese (1624–1626)
 Giovanni Stefano Donghi (1643–1655)
 Paolo Emilio Rondinini (1655–1656)
 Giancarlo de' Medici (1656–1663)
 Angelo Celsi (1664–1668)
 Paolo Savelli (1669–1670; 1678–1683)
 Sigismondo Chigi (1670–1678)
 Fulvio Astalli (1686–1688)
 Gasparo Cavalieri (1688–1689)
 Giuseppe Renato Imperiali (1690–1726–1732)
 Agapito Mosca (1732–1743)
 Prospero Colonna di Sciarra (1743–1756)
 Niccolò Perelli (1759–1772)
 Antonio Casali (1773–1777)
 Romoaldo Guidi (1778–1780) 
 Vincenzo Maria Altieri (1781–1787) 
 Giovanni Rinuccini (1794–1801) 
vacant
 Tommaso Riario Sforza (1823)
vacant
 Giuseppe Ugolini (1838)
vacant
 Francesco de' Medici di Ottaiano (1856–1857)
vacant
 Antonio Matteucci (1866)
vacant
 Tommaso Martinelli (1874–1875)
John Henry Newman (1879–1890) 
vacant
 Francis Aidan Gasquet (1914–1915)
 Luigi Sincero (1923–1928–1933)
 Giovanni Mercati (1936–1957)
 André-Damien-Ferdinand Jullien (1958–1964)
 Benno Gut, O.S.B. (1967–1970)
 Sergio Pignedoli (1973–1980)
 Alfons Maria Stickler (1985–1996–2007)
 Gianfranco Ravasi (2010-2021– )

See also
St George's Church (disambiguation), for a list of other churches worldwide of the same name.

References

Bibliography

Batiffol, Pierre (1887), "Inscriptions byzantines de St-Georges au Vélabre,"  Mélanges d'archéologie et d'histoire VII (Paris: E. Thorin 1887), pp. 419-431. 

Cozza-Luzi, Giuseppe (1899), "Velabrensia. Studio storico critico sulla chiesa di S. Giorgio in Velabro. Sue memorie ed epigrafe," Bessarione Anno IV, Vol. VI (Roma: E. Loescher 1899), pp. 58-95.
  
 
 
 Federico di San Pietro, Memorie istoriche del sacro tempio, o sia Diaconia di San Giorgio in Velabro (Roma: Paolo Giunchi 1791).

 Giannettini, A. and C. Venanzi, S. Giorgio al Velabro (Roma: Marietti, 1967). 
 Gurco, Maria Grazia (2003). "The Church of St. George in Velabrum in Rome: techniques of construction, materials and historical transformations," Proceedings of the First International Congress on Construction History (ed. Santiago Huerta) (Madrid 2003)  Vol. 3, pp. 2009-2013.

 Antonio Muñoz (1935). Il restauro della basilica di S. Giorgio al Velabro in Roma (Roma: Società editrice d'arte illustrata, 1926).

External links
Sketch of S. Giorgio (ca. 1900)
High-resolution 360° Panoramas and Images of San Giorgio in Velabro | Art Atlas
The History of the Church of San Giorgio in Velabro

Giorgio
9th-century churches in Italy
Giorgio Velabro
9th-century establishments in Italy
Religious buildings and structures completed in 847